Zeiraphera thymelopa is a species of moth of the family Tortricidae. It is found in China (Fujian, Tibet, Shaanxi, Gansu, Yunnan).

References

Moths described in 1938
Eucosmini